Pilar Benejam i Arguimbau (born 1937) is a Spanish geographer and pedagogue. In 1961 she graduated in teaching from the School of the Balearic Islands. In 1966 she obtained a licentiate in pedagogy, and another in history from the University of Barcelona in 1972. Finally, in 1985, she received a doctorate in pedagogy from the Autonomous University of Barcelona (UAB).

Biography
Pilar Benejam Arguimbau was born in 1937. She has a distant kinship with Professor Joan Benejam i Vives (1846–1922).

Since 1972, she has been a professor in the Department of Language Teaching, Literature, and Social Sciences at the UAB.

She has worked at the Costa y Llobera School, and at the Talitha School.

She has been part of several commissions for the reform of teacher training in Catalonia and the rest of Spain. She is an expert in issues of review of school programming in social sciences, and has advised public administrations in reference to the overall training cycle. Since 1994, she has been director of the UAB's Institute of Education Sciences.

She has been interested in all aspects of pedagogical renovation and didactic innovation, and in the introduction of the teaching of the different epistemological proposals of geography.

Works
 Intercanvi. Geografia humana i econòmica del món actual (1976)
 La formación de maestros. Una propuesta alternativa (1986)
 Geografía e historia: educación secundaria, Editor Vicens-Vives, Editorial SA, 224 pages,  (1995)
 El proyecto curricular en el contexto del proyecto educativo institucional (1999)
 Una geografía humana renovada: lugares y regiones en un mundo global (2000)
 El mestre Joan Benejam i Vives, City Council of Ciudadela and Council of Education and Culture of the Government of the Balearic Islands, Mahón, Impresos Domingo, 31 pages (2001)
 Las ciencias sociales: concepciones y procedimientos (2002)
 Didáctica y construcción del conocimiento social en la escuela, Pensamiento Educativo 30: 61-74 (2002)
 Agora 3, Ediciones Vicens Vives, 344 pages,  (2010)
 Demos 3, Vol. 3: secondary education, Ediciones Vicens Vives, 344 pages,  (2010)
 Nou Cives 3, Ediciones Vicens Vives, 352 pages,  (2011)
 Nuevo Demos, 3 ESO (Madrid), with Albet i Mas, Montserrat Casas Vilalta, Pilar Comes Sole, Montserrat Oller Freixa, Ediciones Vicens Vives, 352 pages,  (2011)
 Nuevo Demos 3 Canarias Trimestralizado, with A. Albet i Mas, Montserrat Casas Vilalta, Pilar Comes Sole, Montserrat Oller Freixa, Ediciones Vicens Vives, 360 pages, 
 Geography And History 1.1-1.2+cd's, with Margarita Garcia Sebastian, Abel Albet Mas, Cristina Gatell Arimont, Ediciones Vicens Vives, 288 pages,  (2011)
 Lurra Berria 1 Euskadi, Ediciones Vicens Vives, 296 pages,  (2011)
 "Excursions i activitats a Primària i Secundària", Perspectiva escolar 362: 72-75  (2012)
 "Enric Lluch i Martín, la geografía, l'educació i el compromís cívic", Perspectiva escolar 367: 70-73  (2013)

Honors
 Member of the editorial team of the Journals of the University of Murcia
 Sponsor of the Doctor Honoris Causa of the pedagogue Marta Mata (1926–2006)

Awards
 2003: Ramon Llull Award
 2004: Creu de Sant Jordi, awarded by the Generalitat de Catalunya
 2004: Jaume Vicens Vives Award
 2004: Emili Darder Prize, awarded for a life dedicated to teacher training
 2011: Catalonia Education Award
 2015: Gold Medal of Ciutadella

References

1937 births
20th-century Spanish scientists
21st-century Spanish scientists
20th-century Spanish women writers
21st-century Spanish women writers
Autonomous University of Barcelona alumni
Academic staff of the Autonomous University of Barcelona
Women writers from Catalonia
Living people
People from Ciutadella de Menorca
Spanish geographers
Spanish women scientists
University of Barcelona alumni
Women educational theorists
Women geographers